Willow Springs (formerly, Willow Spring Lodge) is a motel and trailer/RV park in Mono County, California.

References

Unincorporated communities in California
Unincorporated communities in Mono County, California